Teen Big Brother: The Experiment also known as Teen Big Brother is a United Kingdom reality television spin off of the show Big Brother where a group of teenagers lived in the Big Brother House for ten days. It was pre-recorded on 30 July - 8 August 2003 shortly after the fourth series of Big Brother ended and was aired on Channel 4 over five nights on 13–17 October 2003. The program consisted of five episodes, each approximately 60 minutes long including adverts, with Elaine Hackett serving as executive producer for Endemol UK Productions. Channel 4 announced the series on 22 May 2003 for the broadcaster's educational division 4Learning with the aim of transmitting the series in late 2003 or early 2004. The series was controversial as some felt the broadcaster was exploiting the teenagers while the program featured the first sexual act between two contestants in the history of the British adaptation of Big Brother. 

The series followed a similar format to its parent show where the contestants, known as Housemates, lived inside a specialty built compound known as the Big Brother House at Elstree Studios. The Housemates were constantly filmed during their time in the House and were not permitted to speak with those filming them. Due to the pre-recorded nature of the programme the viewing public was unable to vote during evictions and decide the winner instead the Housemates did all the voting during their time in the House. The Housemates competed to win a trip around the world worth £30,000 which was won by Paul Brennan after he was crowned the winner with a majority vote from his Housemates. Brennan chose to share his prize with Caroline Cloke, the runner-up.

Production 
Channel 4 announced it had commissioned Teen Big Brother: The Experiment from Endemol UK Productions shortly prior to the launch of the fourth series of Big Brother. The programme was part of an effort to produce educational programming that was aimed at a young adult market. The programme was revealed by Heather Rabbatts from Channel 4's educational division, 4Learning, at the World Education Market in Lisbon. The audition process used to select the Housemates was similar to the one Endemol used in the past for Big Brother. Elaine Hackett served as the executive producer for the series while Marcus Bentley returned to narrate the series. In a change Dermot O'Leary, host of Big Brother's Little Brother presented the series instead of Davina McCall.

Broadcast 
The main television coverage for Teen Big Brother was screened during five episodes, each approximately 60 minutes long including adverts, on Channel 4 from 13 October to 17 October 2003 at 10pm. E4 previewed each episode a day before they were transmitted on Channel 4. Due to the pre-recorded nature of the programme there was no live streaming or any spin-off shows that aired during the original broadcast. The show was later re-aired as part of Channel 4's 4Learning programme block in January 2004.

Format 
The format was changed slightly from previous series of Big Brother. Housemates were incarcerated in the Big Brother House with no contact to and from the outside world. During their time in the House, the housemates took part in a compulsory task that determined the amount of money they were allocated to spend on their shopping; if they passed, they received a luxury budget and they were allocated a basic budget if they failed. Housemates were instructed to nominate two fellow Housemates for eviction. This compulsory vote was conducted in the privacy of the Diary Room and housemates were not allowed to discuss the nomination process or influence the nominations of others. The two or more housemates who gathered the most nominations were then nominated for eviction and the remaining Housemates that were safe from eviction had to decide which nominee would be evicted. On the final day the remaining Housemates voted for who they wanted to win Teen Big Brother. Housemates could voluntarily leave the House at any time and those who broke the rules could have been ejected by Big Brother. The teen Housemates were not allowed to have cigarettes or alcohol during their stay in the House.

Housemates 
All the Housemates in this edition were eighteen years old when they entered the Big Brother House.

Episodes

Nomination and voting history

Notes

Controversy and criticism 
The series attracted criticism for Channel 4 after the press began to report about two of the Housemates having sex inside the House. The Learning and Skills Council gave Channel 4 advice as part of its work enhance education contents of their programmes which included Teen Big Brother. In an interview with The Guardian in September 2003, Channel 4 confirmed that incident would not air as part of its 4Learning educational arm but references to the incident would not be cut out. At the time Channel 4 had not confirmed any other plans for the programme. After the broadcaster decided to show Teen Big Brother in primetime  it began receiving criticism from the media. The episode which featured the incident was watched by 1.9 million viewers on Channel 4 and was the lowest rated out of all five. A Channel 4 spokeswoman said "the broadcaster was happy with the show's ratings."

See also 

Pinoy Big Brother: Teen Edition

References

External links

2003 British television seasons
Channel 4 original programming
2000s British reality television series
2003 British television series debuts
2003 British television series endings
UK
British television spin-offs
Reality television spin-offs
Television series about teenagers
Television shows shot at Elstree Film Studios